Pettus is a census-designated place (CDP) in Bee County, Texas, United States. The population was 558 at the 2010 census.

Geography
Pettus is located in northern Bee County at  (28.6180446, -97.8022219). U.S. Route 181 passes through the community, leading south  to Beeville, the county seat, and north  to Kenedy.

Demographics
As of the census of 2000, there were 608 people, 223 households, and 169 families residing in the CDP. The population density was 104.8 people per square mile (40.5/km2). There were 257 housing units at an average density of 44.3/sq mi (17.1/km2). The racial makeup of the CDP was 71.88% White, 0.49% Native American, 24.67% from other races, and 2.96% from two or more races. Hispanic or Latino of any race were 54.11% of the population.

There were 223 households, out of which 35.9% had children under the age of 18 living with them, 56.5% were married couples living together, 14.8% had a female householder with no husband present, and 24.2% were non-families. 22.0% of all households were made up of individuals, and 10.8% had someone living alone who was 65 years of age or older. The average household size was 2.73 and the average family size was 3.17.

In the CDP, the population was spread out, with 29.3% under the age of 18, 7.4% from 18 to 24, 22.0% from 25 to 44, 26.8% from 45 to 64, and 14.5% who were 65 years of age or older. The median age was 37 years. For every 100 females, there were 99.3 males. For every 100 females age 18 and over, there were 90.3 males.

The median income for a household in the CDP was $28,500, and the median income for a family was $35,469. Males had a median income of $23,750 versus $19,464 for females. The per capita income for the CDP was $12,486. About 11.8% of families and 16.0% of the population were below the poverty line, including 21.2% of those under age 18 and 8.2% of those age 65 or over.

Education
Pettus is served by the Pettus Independent School District and home to the Pettus Secondary School Eagles.

References

External links
 Handbook of Texas Online article

Census-designated places in Bee County, Texas
Census-designated places in Texas